Marcel Colleu (8 February 1897 – 28 September 1973) was a French racing cyclist. He rode in the 1925 Tour de France.

References

1897 births
1973 deaths
French male cyclists
Place of birth missing